The Shanghai Biennale is one of the highest-profile contemporary art events in Shanghai and the most established art biennale in China. It was initially held in the Shanghai Art Museum. From 2012 on, it has been hosted in Power Station of Art, the first state-run museum dedicated to contemporary art in mainland China. Shanghai Biennale provides artists, curators, writers and art supporters from around the world with a space to meet and exchange ideas about their experiences, works and inspirations to create international dialogues. It highlights the achievements of Asian artistic creativity and production and challenges the conventional division of the world between East and West. Aside from its main museum show, it also includes talks, lectures and installations in various venues throughout the city.

First edition 
The Shanghai Biennale was founded in 1996 by Fang Zengxian, then director of the Shanghai Art Museum, and was hosted at the museum for eight editions before switching to the Power Station of Art in 2012. The first edition of Shanghai (Fine Art) Biennale was approved by the Ministry of Culture and Shanghai Municipal Administration and held from March 18 to April 7, 1996. Its theme was named “Open Space” in order to highlight the new opening of the country towards the development of many cultural fields. This edition was attended by 29 artists and displayed 114 pieces of artworks including paintings and installations. Among the 29 artists, 26 are oil painters and 3 are Chinese diaspora artists whose installation works were shown.

1998 edition 
The second edition of Shanghai Biennale was organized in collaboration with the Annie Wong Art Foundation and on displayed from October 10 to November 20, 1998. The exhibition almost doubled in size and showcased a total of 200 works from 50 artists, of which 15 are Chinese diaspora artists. The theme is “Integration and Expansion”, which explored ink as an important subject matter throughout the history of Chinese modern art. Using a traditional art medium in China, the works displayed a wide range of techniques, expressions and experiments. The main object of this edition was to contextualize the development of ink art even in the contemporary production of artworks and to explore new possibilities of its employment.

2000 edition 

The year 2000 is a turning point as many ground-breaking elements were implemented. This was the first edition that invited foreign artists and curators, and displayed new media artworks that are more at the forefront of contemporary art with the purpose to improve Shanghai's role in arts as the “gateway to the west”. This edition was held from November 6, 2000 to January 6, 2001. It was also the first that gained global attention. The international aspect of this edition can be deduced from the title: even if it has been translated into “Spirit of Shanghai”, the Chinese characters create a wordplay upon the name of the city (上"Shang" and 海"Hai" so “over the sea”) that stands for “on the high seas”. It suggested Asia as an important agent in global contemporary art movements and discourses. The curatorial team was headed by Hou Hanru.

2002 edition 
Named “Urban Creation”, the four edition of Shanghai Biennale consisted of “Urban Creation” exhibition and the “Shanghai hundred historic buildings” exhibition. The aim of the fourth edition was to incentivize the advance of urbanization and its related changing in cultural patterns and lifestyle. A constructive analysis of that time situation led to examine both rural and urban, traditional and modern, local and global environments in order to create new ideas for the development of Chinese contemporary construction system. From November 22, 2002 to January 20, 2003 a group of 68 artists and architects took part in it with their 300 works, some of them created expressly for Shanghai Biennale.

2004 edition 

From September 28 to November 28, 2004 Shanghai dealt with the exploration of the visible world, so the world of technology and its way of impacting on human daily life. Named “Techniques of the Visible”, it focused on the close relationship between art and technology, especially how art reveals its interdependent nature that produces technology and then related itself to humanity. This fifth edition has involved a wide series of shows in the whole city (multi-site exhibitions), organized by a team of three Chinese curators and an Argentinean one: Xu Jiang, Sebastián López, Zheng Shengtian, and Zhang Qing. Bringing performance, video, photography, installation and other interactive technologies and together, the curators intended to draw the attention on the diversity of contemporary art practice in all over the world.

2006 edition 

Living in the era of ubiquitous design and art, the sixth edition of Shanghai Biennale focused on "hyper design" as its main theme. From September 6 to November 5, 2006 it examined how design is constantly linked to everyday life. Design aims to break the common antagonistic relationship between art and practical as well as creation and industry, leading people to ponder over life aesthetics.

2008 edition 

The seventh edition of Shanghai Biennale lasted from September 9 to November 16, 2008 and evolved from the urban condition of the city itself, as a starting point for its own artistic development. Being one of the current forces that drive the city as well as its socio-economic structure and spaces, urbanization can be considered as the key of modern urban society change. “Translocalmotion” dealt with urban people dynamics and their relationship with the city. In line with this, the curatorial team proposed to let People Square play an important role for the exhibitions since it is the emblem of transition of current Chinese society. As a metaphor for the complex mobility of citizens, the works have been displayed both inside and outside the Shanghai Art Museum: solo-shows concerning the mobility related to the urban and social developments, works reflecting an environment different from the city one, exhibitions taking place in international airports as well as the main train stations.

2010 edition 
Lasting from October 24, 2010 to January 23, 2011, the eighth edition of Shanghai Biennale was defined as a "rehearsal" so a reflective space of performance and included an unprecedented amount of performance art. Considering the exhibition space not only as a display of artworks, but also as a productive and dynamic theatre of emotions, Shanghai Biennale aimed to drive artists, curators, critics, collectors, museum directors and members of the audience to rehearse the relations between artistic experiments and the art system, between individual creativity and the public domain. Rehearsing is here a way of thinking and a strategy to awake and stimulate creativity in order to explore the many possibilities of that present time. This edition could be considered as a self-performative act of the art world, an attempt to promote self-liberation and reject the traditional frames of “performance” and “artistic production”. The specific responsibility of the curators, who included Fan Di’an, director of the National Art Museum of China, and Gao Shiming, a professor at the China Academy of Art in Hangzhou., was to differentiate, organize and then mobilize the whole art system.

2012 edition 

The ninth edition of Shanghai Biennale was held in the Power Station of Art, a brand-new location with almost 97,000 square feet of exhibition space from October 2, 2012 to March 31, 2013. To fill the voluminous halls of this new venue, large-scale works were chosen by the chief curator Qiu Zhije, the Hong Kong curator Johnson Chang, the New York-based media theorist Boris Groys, and Jens Hoffmann, deputy director of the Jewish Museum in New York. A total number of 90 solo artists and collectives from 27 countries were selected according to their interpretation of “Reactivation”, the theme of the 2012 Shanghai Biennale. “Reactivation” referred to the reform and restarting of the Nanshi Power Plant and the Expo 2010 “Pavilion of Future” in the shape of Power Station of Art, a powerhouse of cultural energy, able to produce creative strength and to activate artists. In this occasion, the project named “Inter-City Pavilion” stood as a means to go beyond locality in order to explore all the different possibilities to develop the city and its cultural expressions.  It has been a natural and progressive step after Expo 2010, an event that has totally changed the city, carrying new local identities rooted in urban realities.

2014 edition 

The tenth edition of Shanghai Biennale was characterized by questions about the relationship between the social and the fictive spheres in the building of society, and the different ways in which the “social” is produced in the 21st century. From November 23, 2014 to March 31, 2015, the “Social Factory” edition, investigated the “social facts” and their transformations  especially in visual art, culture and customs, from the pre-industrial, through the industrial and post-industrial eras. The process encompassed the creation of symbols, abstract images and conceptual generalizations connected to culture and its meanings through complex relations. Due to this complicated genealogy, “social facts” can never be entirely known; they remain partially implicit, sited between the actual and the potential. This Biennale aims to inspire visitors to reflect on how the industrialized society influences culture and how this last one is going to change in the digital area, where the creative power of mankind has been unleashed.

2016 edition 
“Why not ask again?” is the byword of the 11th Shanghai Biennale (2016 November, 11 - 2017 March 12) chosen by Raqs Media Collective in the shape of Jeebesh Bagchi, Monica Narula and Shuddhabrata Sengupta. The theme arises in the form of a question, carrying a double meaning and leading to a storm of interpretations. Since the task of “asking” can stand both to simply asking a question and trying to go beyond it, maybe reawakening a desire, this edition aims to go beyond the predictable. The unpredictable is here welcomed, not feared: it is the drive towards the constant questioning about everything around us.

Questions can be considered as “pressure points” too. They are the starting points to investigate things in order to discover and raise different feelings and emotions. Giving them primacy in this edition of the Shanghai Biennale means shifting these “pressure points” to our contemporary world by trying to find out what and how many sensations it constantly evokes. Inspired by  the reading of the Indian New Cinema movement pioneer Ritwik Ghatak’s film Jukti, Takko aar Gappo, the curators have identified three clear conceptual “pressure points”: Arguments, Counter-arguments, and Stories. Offering pleasurable queries and stimulating creativity are the main ambitions of the 11th Shanghai Biennale and its artists. Raqs asks to the audience to be constantly curious and passionate about the complexity and richness of art and life.

11th Shanghai Biennale develops through a series of intersecting sections named “Terminals”, “Infra-Curatorial Platform”, “Theory Opera”, “51 Personae” and “City Projects”.

“Terminals” involves staging posts, launching pads, or connecting hubs, considered by Raqs as good means to show the artists’ abilities to act as shapers of discourse as well as engines of the imagination in the contemporary world. Artists are here invited to submit questions, propositions and narratives to the audience through their works. “Terminals” features artists Ivana Franke (Croatia), Regina José Galindo (Guatemala), Marjolijn Dijkman (Netherland) and MouSen + MSG (China).

“Infra-Curatorial Platform” consists of an exploration of the different curatorial key points that draw upon new questions and stressed images about all the possible ways of perceiving the curatorial issue. Among the possible arguments, there are moments of ventilation, pause, expansion and relay that can lead to conversations that help the audience figuring out the curatorial work. For this edition, seven young curators from different parts of the world will develop their own sub-exhibitions. They are Didem Yazısı (Turkey), Ivan Isaev (Russia), Liu Tian (China), Mouna Mekounar (France), Sabih Ahmed (India), Srajana Kaikini (India) and Ugochukwu-Smooth Nzewi (Nigeria).

Taking questions as attitudes or forms of life, “Theory Opera” is another kind of discursive path that can be considered as a real orchestration of major and minor modes in thought and speculation. Coordinated by Liu Tian in collaboration with Yao Mengxi, it combines the heft of philosophy with the cadence of Opera in order to explore the sensuality of thoughts.

Curated by Raqs Media Collective, Chen Yun and the “51 Personae Group” of the Dinghaiqiao Mutual Aid Society, “51 Personae” displays a series of exciting actions that celebrate lifestyle, dreams, relationships and experiences of citizens of Shanghai. This project explores daily stories, regarding them as idealistic proposals to re-imagine a new urban life.

“City Projects” are extensions of the Shanghai Biennale main theme. They consist of a program of events that intend to maintain a close dialogue between art and the city. Guided walks, gatherings, performances, talks, special exhibitions by emerging curators, podcasts and dialogues are organized throughout the city for the whole duration of the Biennale.

References

External links 

Shanghai Art Museum 
Shanghai Biennale Official Site
Power Station of Art

Culture in Shanghai
Art exhibitions in China
Events in Shanghai
Recurring events established in 1996
1996 establishments in China
Art biennials
Tourist attractions in Shanghai